Colonița is a village in Chișinău municipality, Moldova.

Notable people
 Dorin Chirtoacă
 Gheorghe Ghimpu 
 Mihai Ghimpu 
 Simion Ghimpu

References

Villages of Chișinău Municipality